Claire Kerrane (born 24 April 1992) is an Irish Sinn Féin politician who has been a Teachta Dála (TD) for the Roscommon–Galway constituency since the 2020 general election. 

She is a member of the Sinn Féin Ard Chomhairle. She is the party's Spokesperson on Social Protection, Community and Rural Development and the Islands.

Early and personal life
Kerrane, the daughter of Gerry and Angela Kerrane, from the village of Tibohine, County Roscommon. She was raised on a farm. She has said there was no history of republicanism in her family: her mother is English and her paternal grandfather was a "staunch Fine Gael activist". She joined Sinn Féin during a dispute over plans to build an anaerobic digestion plant in her area, when she became involved in an action group against the project.

Kerrane joined Ogra Sinn Féin at the age of 15 and was a leading Sinn Féin organiser at NUI Galway during her time as a university student there studying English, Sociology and Politics. She was still a student at NUIG when she became a parliamentary assistant to Independent TD Luke 'Ming' Flanagan upon his election to the Dáil in the 2011 Irish general election. Later she became a political adviser on social protection for Sinn Féin in Leinster House. Flanagan endorsed her as a candidate at the 2020 general election.

In 2016 Kerrane qualified as a secondary school teacher.

References

External links
Sinn Féin profile

1992 births
Living people
Alumni of the University of Galway
Members of the 33rd Dáil
21st-century women Teachtaí Dála
Sinn Féin TDs (post-1923)
Politicians from County Roscommon